Michael Cannon may refer to:
Michael F. Cannon, American health policy researcher
Michael R. Cannon (born 1953), American businessman
Michael Cannon (sprinter), American sprinter

See also
 Mike Cannon-Brookes (born 1979), Australian billionaire, co-founder and co-CEO of the software company Atlassian